StAR-related lipid transfer domain protein 13 (STARD13) also known as deleted in liver cancer 2 protein (DLC-2) is a protein that in humans is encoded by the STARD13 gene and a member of the DLC family of proteins.

Function and structure
STARD13 serves as a Rho GTPase-activating protein (GAP), a type of protein that regulates members of the Rho family of GTPases.  It selectively activates RhoA and CDC42 and suppresses cell growth by inhibiting actin stress fiber assembly.

The protein consists of an N-terminal sterile alpha motif (SAM) domain, a serine-rich domain, a RhoGAP domain and at the C-terminus, a StAR-related lipid-transfer domain (START).

Tissue distribution and pathology
The protein was identified in part through its differential expression in cancers.  A low level of STARD13 was observed in less differentiated hepatocellular carcinoma tissue with higher RhoA expression.  A small patient study finds that the absence of STARD13 in hepatocellular carcinomas correlates with higher levels of RhoA and a poorer prognosis than patients with carcinomas that were STARD13-positive.

Model organisms 

Model organisms have been used in the study of STARD13 function. A conditional knockout mouse line, called Stard13tm1a(KOMP)Wtsi was generated as part of the International Knockout Mouse Consortium program — a high-throughput mutagenesis project to generate and distribute animal models of disease to interested scientists — at the Wellcome Trust Sanger Institute.

Male and female animals underwent a standardized phenotypic screen to determine the effects of deletion. Twenty four tests were carried out on mutant mice and two significant abnormalities were observed. Female homozygous mutants had an increased susceptibility to Citrobacter infection and displayed a decreased hematocrit and hemoglobin content.

Another study of mice lacking STARD13, found it may promote blood vessel formation (angiogenesis), especially by tumor cells.  The promotion of angiogenesis with the loss of STARD13 occurs through the actions of RhoA.

References

Further reading 

 
 
 
 
 

Genes on human chromosome 13
Genes mutated in mice